The NCL or National Conference League Division Three (known as the Kingstone Press NCL Division Three). The top 3 teams gain promotion to NCL Division Two. The bottom three sides have to renew their members any new members have to be elected to the league.

History 
2012:

 Champions (Elected to Championship 1): Hemel Stags
 Remain in division 3 for 2013: Huddersfield Underbank Rangers and Coventry Bears
 Demoted to Conference League South: Nottingham Outlaws, Bristol Sonics and St Albans Centurions
 Demoted to Yorkshire Men's League: Bramley Buffaloes and Kippax Knights
 Folded: Warrington Wizards (joined Woolston Rovers) 
 Accepted into division 3 for 2013: Kells, Pilkington Recs, Hindley, Wigan St Cuthbert's, Peterlee Pumas, Blackbrook and Woolston Rovers.

2013:

 Champions: Kells
 Also promoted: Pilkington Recs

2014:

 Champions: Featherstone Lions
 Also promoted: Blackbrook and Underbank Rangers
 Elected to League 1: Coventry Bears
 Resigned midseason: Wigan St Cuthberts
 Resigned after season: Hindley; Peterlee Pumas
 Elected to league for next season: Dewsbury Moor, Drighlington, Gateshead Storm, Hunslet Club Parkside, Thornhill Trojans and Wibsey Warriors

2015:

 Champions: Hunslet Club Parkside
 Also promoted: Stanningley and Thornhill Trojans
 Resigned midseason: Heworth
 Resigned after season: Wibsey Warriors
 Elected to league for next season: Castleford Panthers and Rylands Sharks

2016:

 Champions: Crosfields
 Also promoted: Drighlington
 Resigned midseason: Castleford Panthers
 Elected to league for next season: Barrow Island, Clock Face Miners and West Bowling

2017:

 Champions: West Bowling
 Also promoted: Dewsbury Moor Maroons and Stanningley
 Resigned midseason: Elland and Rylands Sharks
 Elected to league for next season: Beverley

2018:

 Champions: Beverley
 Also promoted: Barrow Island and Clock Face Miners
 Resigned after season: Stanley Rangers
 Elected to league for next season: Batley Boys, Heworth, Hensingham

League winners

New members 
2019: The Kingstone Press National Conference league will run with 50 teams next season after Batley Boys, Hensingham and Heworth were all duly elected to the competition for 2019.

The votes were overwhelmingly in favour of backing the NCL Management recommendations that proposed a return to the NCL for Heworth after a three-year absence, and new members in Batley Boys and Hensingham.

2019 teams 
 Woolston Rovers
 Hunslet Warriors 
 Batley Boys
 Heworth
 Dewsbury Celtic 
 Drighlington
 Leigh East
 Waterhead Warriors
 Oldham St Annes
 Hensingham
 Millom
 Gateshead 
 Eastmoor Dragons
 Salford City Roosters

Promoted teams 2019: Woolston Rovers (as champions), Hunslet Warriors and Dewsbury Celtic.

References

3
2012 establishments in England
Sports leagues established in 2012